The NFW E.I was a prototype fighter aircraft built in Germany during World War I.

Design
The E.I was an all-wood single-seat monoplane powered by an Oberursel U.0 rotary engine. The wing had two spars between which the pilot's seat was located, but also a plywood trim. One prototype was built and flown in 1917, but the type did not enter production.

Specifications

See also

References

Further reading

E.I
1910s German fighter aircraft
Military aircraft of World War I
Single-engined tractor aircraft
Mid-wing aircraft
Aircraft first flown in 1917
Rotary-engined aircraft